Hari Dev Joshi (17 December 1920 – 21 March 1995) was a freedom fighter and an Indian politician from Indian National Congress. He was chief minister of Rajasthan three times.

Political career 

In 1952, he got elected from Dungarpur then shifted to Ghatol in 1957 and then was elected 8 times from Banswara until his death. He stood undefeated consecutively in all the elections.
He was chief minister of Rajasthan three times, first from 11 October 1973 to 29 April 1977, second time from 10 March 1985 to 20 January 1988 and finally for a short time from 4 December 1989 to 4 March 1990.

He also has served as a Governor of Assam, Meghalaya and West Bengal.

Commemoration

Institutes named after him include Haridev Joshi University of Journalism and Mass Communication in Jaipur and the Haridev Joshi Government Girl's College, Banswara.

External links
 picture

References

1920 births
1995 deaths
Chief Ministers of Rajasthan
Governors of Assam
Governors of Meghalaya
Governors of West Bengal
Indian politicians with disabilities
People from Banswara district
Leaders of the Opposition in Rajasthan
Members of the Rajasthan Legislative Assembly
Chief ministers from Indian National Congress
Indian National Congress politicians from Rajasthan